Noch is a 1986 album by Soviet rock band Kino. It is the group's first official album release.

The original release was via cassettes and Andrei Tropillo released the album on magnitizdat. In 1988, the album was issued on vinyl by Melodiya without the group's permission, which angered the group. Viktor Tsoi criticized the release of the album, saying that they release material without the consent of the author, and also do the design as they wished. The disc was released without the knowledge of the musicians themselves; however, it sold over two million copies, making the group popular throughout the Soviet Union. The song "Anarchy" had a subtitle - "A Parody of Western Punk Bands." Later, it was changed to Mother Anarchy with no subtitling. According to the editor of the issue, N. Baranovskaya, this was done in order to be approved by the Ministry Of Culture in Russia.

Track listing
"Видели ночь" / "Videli noch" / "Saw the Night" (3:07)
"Фильмы" / "Filmiy" / "Films" (4:52)
"Твой номер" / "Tvoi nomer" / "Your Number" (3:27)
"Танец" / "Tanyets" / "Dance" (4:31)
"Ночь" / "Noch" / "Night" (5:27)
"Последний герой" / "Posledniy geroi" / "Last Hero" (2:13)
"Жизнь в стёклах" / "Zhizn' v styoklakh" / "Life in the Windows" (3:20)
"Мама Анархия" / "Mama Anarkhiya" / "Mother Anarchy" (2:42)
"Звёзды останутся здесь" / "Zvyozdiy ostanutsya zdyes'" / "The Stars Will Remain Here" (3:35)
"Игра" / "Igra" / "Game" (4:59)
"Мы хотим танцевать" / "Miy khotim tantsevat'" / "We Want to Dance" (3:57)

Personnel
Viktor Tsoi – vocals, acoustic guitar, guitar
Yuri Kasparyan – lead guitar, backing vocals
Aleksandr Titov – bass guitar
Georgiy Guryanov – percussion, backing vocals

Additional personnel
Igor Butman – saxophone
"The Young Brothers" – backing vocals
Andrei Tropillo – flute, backing vocals

References

Soviet rock music
Kino (band) albums
1986 albums